José Hiber Ruíz Nataren (born 31 January 1980) is a Mexican former footballer who last played for Lobos BUAP.

Career
In 2005, he began his career with club Veracruz. He debuted against Atlas with a 2–1 win. He has played with several clubs as Puebla, Monterrey and BUAP. He returned Puebla in 2010, after a short period of time playing in Liga de Ascenso and moved to his first professional team Veracruz in July 2010.

Ruiz has the joint highest balance attribute of any player on the videogame FIFA 13.

References

External links

mediotiempo.com

1980 births
Living people
Club Puebla players
C.D. Veracruz footballers
C.F. Monterrey players
Chiapas F.C. footballers
Indios de Ciudad Juárez footballers
Lobos BUAP footballers
Liga MX players
Footballers from Chiapas
Mexican footballers
Association football midfielders
People from Tonalá, Chiapas